Micah Cheserem is a Kenyan banker and a former chairman of the CRA Commission on Revenue Allocation. He previously worked as a Governor of the Central Bank of Kenya and Chairman of Kenya's Capital Markets Authority.

Bibliography
The will to succeed: an autobiography

See also
 Central Bank of Kenya
 Commission on Revenue Allocation

References

Year of birth missing (living people)
Central Bank of Kenya people
Living people
Governors of the Central Bank of Kenya
Kenyan bankers